Joshua John Cavallo (born 13 November 1999) is an Australian professional association footballer who plays as a left back and central midfielder for A-League Men club Adelaide United. Cavallo has represented the Australian under-20 national team.

Early life
Joshua John Cavallo was born on 13 November 1999 in Bentleigh East, Victoria. He is of Italian and Maltese descent.

Career

Youth

Cavallo represented both Melbourne Victory FC Youth and Melbourne City FC Youth.

Western United
On 15 April 2019, Melbourne City announced that Cavallo would leave the club at the expiration of his contract at the end of the 2018–19 season.

On 24 June 2019, new A-League side Western United announced that Cavallo would join the club ahead of its inaugural season. He made his debut on 3 January 2020 in a 3–2 loss at his previous club. On as a 71st-minute substitute for Apostolos Stamatelopoulos, he earned a penalty when fouled by goalkeeper Dean Bouzanis, which was converted by Besart Berisha.

Western United announced that Cavallo was leaving the club on 10 February 2021 to seek more playing time with another A-League club.

Adelaide United
On 18 February 2021, Cavallo signed a short-term contract to play for Adelaide United. After a successful stint in the 2020–21 A-League, he signed a two-year contract extension on 11 May. He was rewarded with Adelaide United's A-League Rising Star award after a successful 2020–21 campaign, in which he started 15 games and made 18 appearances.

Personal life
Cavallo came out as gay in October 2021. At the time, there were no other openly gay male footballers playing professional top-flight football. He said in a statement, "I hope that in sharing who I am, I can show others who identify as LGBTQ+ that they are welcome in the football community."

Career statistics

See also
 List of Adelaide United FC club award winners

References

External links

1999 births
Living people
Sportsmen from Victoria (Australia)
Australian soccer players
Association football midfielders
Gay sportsmen
Melbourne Victory FC players
Melbourne City FC players
Western United FC players
Adelaide United FC players
National Premier Leagues players
A-League Men players
Australian LGBT soccer players
Australian LGBT sportspeople
Australian people of Italian descent
Australian people of Maltese descent
People from Bentleigh, Victoria
Soccer players from Melbourne